Lysitona is a genus of moths belonging to the family Tineidae. , it contains only one species, Lysitona euryacta, which is found in Mozambique.

References

Endemic fauna of Mozambique
Tineidae
Monotypic moth genera
Lepidoptera of Mozambique
Moths of Sub-Saharan Africa
Taxa named by Edward Meyrick
Tineidae genera